The 2013 WNBA season is the 16th season for the Tulsa Shock of the Women's National Basketball Association. It is their fourth in Tulsa.

Transactions

WNBA Draft
The following are the Shock's selections in the 2013 WNBA Draft.

Roster

Depth

Season standings

Schedule

Preseason

|- style="background:#fcc;"
		 | 1 
		 | May 9
		 |  Atlanta
		 | 
		 | Kayla Pedersen (11)
		 | Courtney Paris (9)
		 | Diggins & Williams (3)
		 | BOK Center5280
		 | 0–1
|- style="background:#fcc;"
		 | 2 
		 | May 17
		 | @ Seattle
		 | 
		 | Riquna Williams (19)
		 | Glory Johnson (18)
		 | Paris, Pedersen, & Williams (2)
		 | Key Arena4347
		 | 0–2
|- style="background:#cfc;"
		 | 3 
		 | May 19
		 | @ Los Angeles
		 | 
		 | Glory Johnson (22)
		 | Glory Johnson (7)
		 | Angel Goodrich (8)
		 | SRC Arena1917
		 | 1–2

Regular season

|- style="background:#fcc;"
		 | 1 
		 | May 25
		 | @ Atlanta
		 | 
		 | Riquna Williams (22)
		 | Liz Cambage (8)
		 | Candice Wiggins (4)
		 | Philips Arena7519
		 | 0–1
|- style="background:#fcc;"
		 | 2 
		 | May 27
		 |  Washington
		 | 
		 | Roneeka Hodges (22)
		 | Glory Johnson (14)
		 | Skylar Diggins (11)
		 | BOK Center7381
		 | 0–2
|- style="background:#fcc;"
		 | 3 
		 | May 31
		 | @ NY Liberty
		 | 
		 | Liz Cambage (22)
		 | Glory Johnson (11)
		 | Candice Wiggins (4)
		 | Prudential Center7532
		 | 0–3

|- style="background:#fcc;"
		 | 4 
		 | June 2
		 | @ Chicago
		 | 
		 | Glory Johnson (15)
		 | Glory Johnson (13)
		 | Hodges, Diggins, & Williams (3)
		 | Allstate Arena6811
		 | 0–4
|- style="background:#cfc;"
		 | 5 
		 | June 7
		 | @ Seattle
		 | 
		 | Glory Johnson (17)
		 | Glory Johnson (9)
		 | Johnson, Hodges, & Diggins (3)
		 | Key Arena6879
		 | 1–4
|- style="background:#fcc;"
		 | 6 
		 | June 8
		 | @ Los Angeles
		 | 
		 | Glory Johnson (17)
		 | Glory Johnson (8)
		 | Candice Wiggins (5)
		 | Staples Center6110
		 | 1–5
|- style="background:#fcc;"
		 | 7 
		 | June 14
		 |  Minnesota
		 | 
		 | Glory Johnson (22)
		 | Glory Johnson (9)
		 | Angel Goodrich (5)
		 | BOK Center5273
		 | 1–6
|- style="background:#fcc;"
		 | 8 
		 | June 16
		 |  Phoenix
		 | 
		 | Glory Johnson (32)
		 | Glory Johnson (15)
		 | Skylar Diggins (8)
		 | BOK Center4206
		 | 1–7
|- style="background:#cfc;"
		 | 9 
		 | June 20
		 |  Chicago
		 | 
		 | Riquna Williams (21)
		 | Glory Johnson (10)
		 | Lacy & Diggins (4)
		 | BOK Center4161
		 | 2–7
|- style="background:#cfc;"
		 | 10 
		 | June 22
		 |  Seattle
		 | 
		 | Roneeka Hodges (19)
		 | Glory Johnson (12)
		 | Skylar Diggins (6)
		 | BOK Center4327
		 | 3–7
|- style="background:#fcc;"
		 | 11 
		 | June 23
		 | @ Minnesota
		 | 
		 | Glory Johnson (24)
		 | Glory Johnson (8)
		 | Skylar Diggins (11)
		 | Target Center8423
		 | 3–8
|- style="background:#fcc;"
		 | 12 
		 | June 28
		 | @ Indiana
		 | 
		 | Nicole Powell (21)
		 | Glory Johnson (11)
		 | Skylar Diggins (5)
		 | Bankers Life Fieldhouse6957
		 | 3–9
|- style="background:#fcc;"
		 | 13 
		 | June 30
		 | @ Washington
		 | 
		 | Roneeka Hodges (16)
		 | Johnson & Paris (7)
		 | Diggins & Williams (3)
		 | Verizon Center6511
		 | 3–10

|- style="background:#fcc;"
		 | 14 
		 | July 2
		 | @ Connecticut
		 | 
		 | Riquna Williams (23)
		 | Glory Johnson (15)
		 | Skylar Diggins (3)
		 | Mohegan Sun Arena5701
		 | 3–11
|- style="background:#fcc;"
		 | 15 
		 | July 11
		 |  Los Angeles
		 | 
		 | Skylar Diggins (19)
		 | Tiffany Jackson-Jones (7)
		 | Angel Goodrich (5)
		 | BOK Center6278
		 | 3–12
|- style="background:#fcc;"
		 | 16 
		 | July 13
		 |  Minnesota
		 | 
		 | Riquna Williams (22)
		 | Liz Cambage (8)
		 | Skylar Diggins (4)
		 | BOK Center6171
		 | 3–13
|- style="background:#cfc;"
		 | 17 
		 | July 17
		 | @ Seattle
		 | 
		 | Riquna Williams (26)
		 | Powell & Cambage (8)
		 | Powell & Wiggins (4)
		 | Key Arena9686
		 | 4–13
|- style="background:#cfc;"
		 | 18 
		 | July 19
		 |  Connecticut
		 | 
		 | Glory Johnson (14)
		 | Johnson & Cambage (17)
		 | Candice Wiggins (2)
		 | BOK Center5294
		 | 5–13
|- style="background:#cfc;"
		 | 19 
		 | July 21
		 |  Atlanta
		 | 
		 | Glory Johnson (24)
		 | Liz Cambage (15)
		 | Nicole Powell (6)
		 | BOK Center4107
		 | 6–13
|- style="background:#fcc;"
		 | 20 
		 | July 25
		 |  Indiana
		 | 
		 | Liz Cambage (13)
		 | Glory Johnson (5)
		 | Johnson, Goodrich, & Williams (2)
		 | BOK Center5018
		 | 6–14

|- align="center"
|colspan="9" bgcolor="#bbcaff"|All-Star Break
|- style="background:#cfc;"
		 | 21 
		 | August 2
		 |  Los Angeles
		 | 
		 | Liz Cambage (28)
		 | Liz Cambage (8)
		 | Angel Goodrich (9)
		 | BOK Center6168
		 | 7–14
|- style="background:#fcc;"
		 | 22 
		 | August 4
		 | @ San Antonio
		 | 
		 | Glory Johnson (19)
		 | Glory Johnson (11)
		 | Skylar Diggins (5)
		 | AT&T Center7950
		 | 7–15
|- style="background:#fcc;"
		 | 23 
		 | August 9
		 | @ Phoenix
		 | 
		 | Liz Cambage (19)
		 | Candice Wiggins (6)
		 | Angel Goodrich (4)
		 | US Airways Center8547
		 | 7–16
|- style="background:#fcc;"
		 | 24 
		 | August 11
		 | @ Phoenix
		 | 
		 | Cambage & Diggins (19)
		 | Cambage & Paris (6)
		 | Skylar Diggins (3)
		 | US Airways Center5972
		 | 7–17
|- style="background:#cfc;"
		 | 25 
		 | August 16
		 | @ Minnesota
		 | 
		 | Liz Cambage (27)
		 | Liz Cambage (8)
		 | Angel Goodrich (8)
		 | Target Center9422
		 | 8–17
|- style="background:#fcc;"
		 | 26 
		 | August 20
		 |  Phoenix
		 | 
		 | Riquna Williams (23)
		 | Liz Cambage (13)
		 | Candice Wiggins (5)
		 | BOK Center4261
		 | 8–18
|- style="background:#cfc;"
		 | 27 
		 | August 23
		 |  San Antonio
		 | 
		 | Liz Cambage (20)
		 | Liz Cambage (8)
		 | Angel Goodrich (4)
		 | BOK Center5923
		 | 9–18
|- style="background:#fcc;"
		 | 28 
		 | August 25
		 | @ Los Angeles
		 | 
		 | Candice Wiggins (20)
		 | Liz Cambage (14)
		 | Wiggins, Goodrich, & Williams (3)
		 | Staples Center9973
		 | 9–19
|- style="background:#fcc;"
		 | 29 
		 | August 30
		 |  San Antonio
		 | 
		 | Riquna Williams (18)
		 | Glory Johnson (12)
		 | Skylar Diggins (7)
		 | BOK Center5452
		 | 9–20

|- style="background:#cfc;"
		 | 30 
		 | September 1
		 |  NY Liberty
		 | 
		 | Candice Wiggins (25)
		 | Courtney Paris (13)
		 | Riquna Williams (6)
		 | BOK Center5818
		 | 10–20
|- style="background:#fcc;"
		 | 31 
		 | September 6
		 |  Los Angeles
		 | 
		 | Glory Johnson (19)
		 | Courtney Paris (9)
		 | Skylar Diggins (3)
		 | BOK Center6704
		 | 10–21
|- style="background:#cfc;"
		 | 32 
		 | September 8
		 | @ San Antonio
		 | 
		 | Riquna Williams (51)
		 | Courtney Paris (8)
		 | Angel Goodrich (11)
		 | AT&T Center6560
		 | 11–21
|- style="background:#fcc;"
		 | 33 
		 | September 12
		 |  Seattle
		 | 
		 | Riquna Williams (17)
		 | Tiffany Jackson-Jones (10)
		 | Riquna Williams (4)
		 | BOK Center6513
		 | 11–22
|- style="background:#fcc;"
		 | 34 
		 | September 14
		 | @ Seattle
		 | 
		 | Jennifer Lacy (21)
		 | Riquna Williams (5)
		 | Riquna Williams (4)
		 | Key Arena8978
		 | 11–23

Statistics

Regular season

Awards and honors

References

External links

Tulsa Shock seasons
Tulsa
Tulsa Shock